The  Miami Marathon is an annual marathon racing event hosted by Miami, Florida, since 2003.
The marathon course also runs through the city of Miami Beach, Florida.  The  race is typically run on the last Sunday in January or the first Sunday in February, at approximately 6:00am.  The event also includes a half marathon, and a wheelchair division for both races.  Marathon finish times can be used to qualify for the Boston Marathon.

Celebrities or local politicians typically start the race.  Frank Shorter, 1972 Olympic marathon champion, and Ryan Hall, winner of the marathon event in the 2008 United States Olympic Trials, have been previously given this honor.

Life Time Fitness produces this event.

History

Orange Bowl era 

Originally the race had started and finished in the Orange Bowl stadium but after issues with the course the start and finish moved to the Crandon Park.
The marathon was never as popular as other races in the racing calendar and had trouble attracting athletes.
Eventually financial problems caused the event fold.

The last Orange Bowl Marathon that the Association of Road Racing Statisticians has record of was held in 1988.

Current era 

The race has been growing over the years.  In 2010, 18,321 runners took part in the combined races.  For the 10 year anniversary in 2012 the race sold out at 25,000 runners and has continued to reach that number of participants since.

The 2021 edition of the race was cancelled due to the coronavirus pandemic. with all registrants given the option of running the race virtually, transferring their entry to 2022, or obtaining a refund (less any processing fees).

Course 

Beginning on Biscayne Boulevard next to the Miami-Dade Arena (home of the Miami Heat), the course takes runners eastbound on the MacArthur Causeway, past cruise ships docked at the Port of Miami, to South Beach. From there, competitors travel northbound along the famous Ocean Drive, through the City of Miami Beach, and then westbound along the Venetian Causeway and back to the mainland and the City of Miami.

Through partnership with Shifting Gears United of South Florida, The Miami Marathon hosts a division for athletes with all disabilities. Sub-divisions include open divisions male and female, push-rim, handcyle
2019 Alfredo De los deSantos member of the Freedom Team of Shifting Gears United.  
Paralympian Alfredo de los deSantos repeats another win.  Bronze medalist at the 2020 Tokyo Paralympics.

Winners

Orange Bowl era 

 Source:

Current era

Notes

References

External links
 

Marathons in the United States
Sports competitions in Miami